International Gemological Institute (IGI) is a diamond, colored stone and jewelry certification  organization. IGI is headquartered in Antwerp and has offices in New York City, Hong Kong, Mumbai, Bangkok, Tokyo, Dubai, Tel Aviv, Toronto, Los Angeles, Kolkata, New Delhi, Surat, Chennai, Thrissur, Ahmedabad, Shanghai, and Cavalese. Established in 1975, IGI is the largest independent gemological laboratory worldwide.  It also runs Schools of Gemology in several locations around the globe.

Operations
IGI has a staff of over 650 gemologists, appraisers and professional office personnel. The International Gemological Institute "has been at the forefront of technology since its commencement in 1975".  This characteristic can be seen in the actions that the IGI has taken recently towards creating an Online Data Retrieval program and its Registration and Recovery Service. The IGI is also perfecting methods to reliably distinguish between synthetic and natural diamonds.

IGI provides its services to the public through diamond dealers, and jewelry manufactures.  IGI provides independent grading reports, colored stone reports, identification and appraisal reports, diamond authentication and attestations of origin, and laser inscription services. They also offers diamond and colored stone courses through IGI's Schools of Gemology.  The IGI school was the first to offer the practical Rough Diamond course. Graduates from the IGI school of  Gemology are awarded an IGI Diploma.

The Toronto location will be closing.

Market position
IGI is the largest laboratory for certification of diamonds and fine jewelry. IGI has the only international certification lab controlled by one central governing body that adheres to one internationally accepted system for diamond grading. IGI is International Organization for Standardization (ISO) 9001: 2000 certified in four countries, including the United States, Canada, India and the United Arab Emirates. Recently, IGI became the first gem lab to collaborate with the Tanzanite Foundation to help distribute jewelry certificates using the Tanzanite Quality Scale, developed by the Tanzanite Foundation in collaboration with IGI. An estimated 11 percent of all diamonds purchased by India's consumers come from IGI vendors in Kolkata.

Expansion
 In March 2007, IGI collaborated with the Tanzanite Foundation to produce a globally acceptable grading scale, called the Tanzanite Quality Scale (TQS), for the popular gem called Tanzanite, which was discovered in Tanzania in the 1960s and is rapidly becoming a globally recognized gem.

 In April 2010, IGI marked the opening of their laboratory in Surat, India. This is IGI's fifth  diamond grading laboratory in India.

References

Further reading

External links
 

Gemological laboratories
Research institutes in Belgium
Organisations based in Antwerp
Organizations established in 1975